Adolphia californica, known by the common names California adolphia, California prickbush, and spineshrub, is a species of flowering shrub in the buckthorn family.

Distribution
The shrub is native to the coastal plains and Peninsular Ranges foothills in northwestern Baja California and San Diego County in Southern California.

It is found in chaparral and coastal sage scrub plant communities, at elevations below .

Description
Adolphia californica is a branching shrub not exceeding  in height.

It has thick hairless to fuzzy dark green twigs. The stiff twigs bear sharp thorns. The very sparse leaves are each less than a centimeter long and oval-shaped with a pointed or rounded tip.

The shrub blooms abundantly in clusters of flowers along all the branches. Each flower is a star-shaped bowl of five pointed cream-colored sepals. Between the sepals are five tiny spoon-shaped cream-colored petals. The bloom period is December to April.

The fruit is a spherical capsule about half a centimeter across.

Conservation
Within California Adolphia californica is a Critically endangered species, listed by the California Native Plant Society on the Inventory of Rare and Endangered Plants.  It is threatened by urbanization, road construction, non-native plants, and grazing.

References

External links
   Calflora Database: Adolphia californica (California adolphia)
Jepson Manual eFlora (TJM2) treatment of Adolphia californica
USDA Plants Profile for Adolphia californica (California prickbush)
UC CalPhotos gallery: Adolphia californica images

Rhamnaceae
Flora of California
Flora of Baja California
Natural history of the California chaparral and woodlands
Natural history of the Peninsular Ranges
Natural history of San Diego County, California
Critically endangered flora of California
Taxa named by Sereno Watson
Flora without expected TNC conservation status